El Periódico is a Honduran newspaper. Former President Rafael Leonardo Callejas is the principal stockholder, and "the paper is known for its conservative views."

References

Newspapers published in Honduras
Spanish-language newspapers
Mass media in Tegucigalpa